The Mount Clare Shops is the oldest railroad manufacturing complex in the United States, located in Baltimore, Maryland.  It was founded by the Baltimore and Ohio Railroad (B&O) in 1829.  Mt. Clare was the site of many inventions and innovations in railroad technology.  It is now the site of the B&O Railroad Museum.  The museum and Mt. Clare station were designated a National Historic Landmark in 1961.

History
The Mount Clare site was a portion of an estate owned by Charles Carroll (barrister), a distant cousin of Charles Carroll of Carrollton. (See Mount Clare (Maryland).) The initial operations of the B&O used horsecars, and the earliest facilities on the Mt. Clare site included a depot and stables for horses.  This was one of the earliest passenger stations in the United States.

Following the 1830 manufacture of the first U.S. steam locomotive by Peter Cooper at the nearby Canton Iron Works, the B&O began building locomotives at Mt. Clare, as well as freight cars, passenger cars, bridges and other railroad equipment. Ross Winans and Phineas Davis, pioneers in locomotive design, built their inventions at Mt. Clare. The shops employed 100 workers in 1839.

The B&O built an ironworks at Mt. Clare in 1850. The first iron railroad bridges, designed by Wendel Bollman, were built in the Mt. Clare shops in the 1850s.  A roundhouse, engine service and car shops, and a new depot were also built at Mt. Clare during this period.

After the Civil War, the railroad built a foundry, blacksmith shop, additional car shops and an office building at Mt. Clare. In 1882, the railroad added a bridge fabrication shop. A circular (actually 22-sided) passenger car shop, sometimes mislabeled as a roundhouse, was designed by architect E. Francis Baldwin and completed in 1884.

Mt. Clare shops employed 1,000 workers by 1852 and over 3,000 in the 1920s.

Between 1900 and 1920, the B&O erected a large locomotive shop, sawmill, machine shop, a grain elevator and a tender shop.  Air-conditioned passenger cars were developed by the B&O and the Carrier Corporation at Mt. Clare in the late 1920s.

The railroad built its last steam locomotive at Mt. Clare in 1948.  During the 1950s, as the railroad increased its use of diesel locomotives, there was less demand for steam locomotive and machine shop work at Mt. Clare.  The railroad abandoned use of the circular car shop in 1953 and made it available for use by the museum.

In 1962, a fire destroyed the Mt. Clare locomotive erecting shop. The Chesapeake and Ohio Railway (C&O) purchased the B&O, also in 1962, and subsequently locomotive repairs were handled at the B&O shops in Cumberland, Maryland. Only car repairs were continued at Mt. Clare, until 1974, when all shop work on the site was discontinued. By this time many of the buildings were in disrepair, and most were demolished by 1976, except for those used by the museum.

See also 
List of locomotive builders
Baltimore and Ohio Railroad Martinsburg Shops

References

External links 
B&O Railroad Museum

Blacksmith shops
Baltimore and Ohio Railroad
Industrial buildings and structures in Maryland
Defunct locomotive manufacturers of the United States
Rail transportation in Maryland
Railway workshops in the United States
Industrial buildings and structures on the National Register of Historic Places in Baltimore
National Historic Landmarks in Maryland
Southwest Baltimore
Railway workshops on the National Register of Historic Places
Railway buildings and structures on the National Register of Historic Places in Maryland
Transportation buildings and structures in Baltimore